Erzsébet Mezei was a female Hungarian international table tennis player.

Table tennis career
She won two bronze medals at the 1949 World Table Tennis Championships in the women's doubles with Rozsi Karpati and in the women's team.

See also
 List of table tennis players
 List of World Table Tennis Championships medalists

References

Hungarian female table tennis players
World Table Tennis Championships medalists